Melyat, is one of the main water streams of Pazar and Çayeli in the eastern Black Sea Region of Turkey. It is 28 km from the city center of Rize. The source of the river is Cegalver Mountain in Hemşin district. River borders the villages of Zafer, Yavuzlar, Erenler, Çınartepe, Kaçkar, Kestanelik, Tektaş, Güneyköy, Şendere, Kuzayca, Örnek, Merdivenli, Leventköy and Balıkçı respectively.

Fauna 
Fish species living in the river are Salmo coruhensis, Alburnus derjugini, Barbus escherichii, Squalius sp., Mugil cephalus, Liza aurata and Ponticola rizensis.

References 

Rivers of Rize Province
Pazar, Rize